Yakso Falls is a  waterfall on Little River, in the Cascade Range east of Roseburg in the U.S. state of Oregon.

In Chinook jargon, Yakso means "hair of the head". The waterfall is said to resemble the long hair of a woman.

The trail, open year-round, passes through selectively logged old-growth forest. 

Other waterfalls in the vicinity include Hemlock Falls, Middle Hemlock Falls, and Upper Hemlock Falls (also known as Clover Falls), all on nearby Hemlock Creek, a Little River tributary. Additional falls within  of Yakso Falls are Tributary Falls on an unnamed tributary of Hemlock Creek; Cedar Creek Falls on Cedar Creek; Flat Rock Falls on the Flat Rock branch of Clover Creek, and Grotto Falls on Emile Creek. Like Hemlock Creek, Cedar, Clover, and Emile creeks are tributaries that enter Little River downstream of Yakso Falls.

References

Waterfalls of Douglas County, Oregon